Karima Bennoune is an Algerian-American who is the Homer G. Angelo and Ann Berryhill Endowed Chair in International Law and Martin Luther King Jr. Professor of Law at the UC Davis School of Law. She was also  United Nations Special Rapporteur in the field of cultural rights from October 2015 to October 2021.

Education
J.D., University of Michigan Law School 1994
M.A. Middle Eastern and North African Studies, University of Michigan Rackham Graduate School 1994
Graduate Certificate, Women's Studies, University of Michigan 1994
B.A. History and Semiotics, Brown University 1988

Career
Before coming to UC Davis, Bennoune was a Professor of Law and Arthur L. Dickson Scholar at Rutgers School of Law – Newark. 

She won the Dayton Literary Peace Prize (2014) for her book, “Your Fatwa Does Not Apply Here: Untold Stories from the Fight Against Muslim Fundamentalism.”

References

External links

 "Voices of Terrorism Victims" UN in Action No. 1579, an interview with Karima Bennoune about her colleague and former neighbor Chadli Hamza who was killed in the bombing; from UN Web TV's UN in Action
 Islam belongs in people's lives, not in politics, says Karima Bennoune  an interview with Karima Bennoune by Mark Tran The Guardian, 28 Oct 2013   

Living people
Year of birth missing (living people)
Brown University alumni
Horace H. Rackham School of Graduate Studies alumni
Rutgers School of Law–Newark faculty
UC Davis School of Law faculty
United Nations special rapporteurs
University of Michigan Law School alumni
Former Muslim critics of Islam
Former Muslims turned agnostics or atheists